Jagna is a municipality in Bohol in the Philippines. 

Jagna may also refer to:

Jagna Marczułajtis, Polish politician and former snowboarder
Jagna Janicka, Polish film and stage costume and scene designer